The Samuel Gwinn Plantation is a historic plantation in Lowell, West Virginia. The main house was built in  circa 1868, although the plantation was begun in the late 18th Century, with secondary structures, such as the meat curing house, dating to the 1770s. It was added to the National Register of Historic Places on March 8, 1989.

References

Houses on the National Register of Historic Places in West Virginia
Italianate architecture in West Virginia
Greek Revival houses in West Virginia
Houses completed in 1868
Houses in Summers County, West Virginia
Plantation houses in West Virginia
National Register of Historic Places in Summers County, West Virginia
Historic districts in Summers County, West Virginia
Historic districts on the National Register of Historic Places in West Virginia